The 18237 / 18238 Chhattisgarh Express is a well known old Indian train which connects  and . Its name represents the state of Chhattisgarh.

History
This train was the first train to originate from newly constructed suburban railway station Habibganj. In year 1980, the train was extended to main railway station of Bhopal; Bhopal Junction.
When started in 1977, timings were:-  16.20;  06.05 &  18.55;  08.40 as Chhattisgarhanchal Express. Later in 1980, timetable was:-  16.20; Bhopal Junction 06.40 & Bhopal Junction 18.20;  08.40. In 1987 after extension to New Delhi was made, timings became  16.20; Bhopal Junction 06.50;  18.35 &  06.25; Bhopal Junction 18.20;  08.40. Again after final extension to Amritsar timings were further changed to  16.20; Bhopal Junction next morning 06.50;  18.35/19.15;  05.20 on 3rd day morning &  19.35;  next morning 05.40/06.20; Bhopal Junction 18.40;  08.35 on 3rd day morning.

Route and halts

Schedule 
Train no. 18238 leaves for its destination stop Amritsar (ASR) at 04:10 PM and reaching in Gevra Road (GAD) at 12:15 PM on third day. During its return journey, this train runs with the No.18237 leaves Gevra Road (GAD) at 11:15 AM and reaching Amritsar (ASR) at 08:10 AM on third day.
The longest halt it took during the journey was at Amla Jn for around 20–25 minutes until 2020 when its link train Pench Valley Passenger was made as a separate Express . around 20–25 minutes halt at Amla Jn was for attachment & detachment system of Chhattisgarh Express & Pench Valley Passenger for period from 2006(maybe 2003) to 2020.

Coach composition
This Train had LHB coach.
 1 SLR
 1 EOG
 2 General Unreserved
 7 Sleeper
 1 Pantry Car
 6 3AC
 2 2AC 
 1 1AC

Locomotive

References

External links
http://indiarailinfo.com/train/323

Named passenger trains of India
Rail transport in Madhya Pradesh
Rail transport in Maharashtra
Rail transport in Punjab, India
Rail transport in Uttar Pradesh
Rail transport in Chhattisgarh
Rail transport in Delhi
Rail transport in Haryana
Transport in Amritsar
Transport in Bilaspur, Chhattisgarh
Express trains in India